The Calle Mayor is a centric street in Madrid, Spain. Located in the Centro District, the Calle Mayor starts in the Puerta del Sol and ends at the cuesta de la Vega.

History 
Created in the Middle Ages it originally connected the alcázar with the Puerta de Guadalajara (a disappeared wall gate). The Calle Mayor, that borders the Plaza Mayor to the North, became the main thoroughfare of the city in the Early Modern Period. The Calle Mayor was the place where the guilds of silversmiths and jewelers concentrated. In the 18th century, the street was divided in three sections with different names: Almudena (from the alcázar surroundings to the Plazuela de la Villa; Platería (from the plazuela de la Villa to the Puerta de Guadalajara), and Mayor (from the Puerta de Guadalajara to the Puerta del Sol).

References

Bibliography 
 
 
 
 
 

Streets in Madrid